Dokument 2 is a Norwegian investigative documentary series that has aired on TV 2 since its inception in 1992. The series was originally hosted by Gerhard Helskog, later by Tonje Steinsland. The documentaries have won several Gullruten awards. Due to major cuts in TV 2, the station's own editorial production of documentaries in the series was dropped in 2009.

References

External links
 Official website with documentaries

1992 Norwegian television series debuts
Norwegian documentary television series
TV 2 (Norway) original programming
1990s Norwegian television series
2000s Norwegian television series
2010s Norwegian television series